Nancy Miller is an American TV writer and producer. Her production company is Paid Our Dues Productions. In 2008, she signed an overall deal with Fox Television Studios.

Credits
 Against The Wall
 Saving Grace
 Under
 The Closer
 Threat Matrix
 CSI: Miami
 Any Day Now
 Leaving L.A.
 Profiler
 The Monroes
 The Marshal
 The Cosby Mysteries
 Against The Grain
 The Round Table
 Law & Order
 Nashville

Awards and nominations
Gracie Allen Awards 
Writers Guild of America Award

References

External links
http://www.imdb.com/name/nm0589043/?ref_=tt_ov_wr
https://web.archive.org/web/20100422013118/http://blog.newsok.com/television/2009/02/25/oklahomas-2009-gracie-allen-award-winners-dr-phil-bob-dotson/
http://www.timewarner.com/newsroom/press-releases/2008/07/TNTs_iThe_Closeri_Scores_as_AdSupported_Cables_1_Series_07-15-2008.php

Year of birth missing (living people)
Living people
Writers from Oklahoma
American television producers
American women television producers
American television writers
American women television writers
21st-century American women